The Roman Catholic Archdiocese of Rabaul is a Latin Rite Metropolitan Archdiocese in Papua New Guinea.
 
It has its cathedral episcopal see Sacred Heart Cathedral in Vunapope and a Co-Cathedral, St Francis Xavier's Co-Cathedral, in Rabaul.

On June 19, 2020, Rochus Josef Tatamai, M.S.C. was appointed the new Archbishop.

History 
In 1844, it was  established as Apostolic Vicariate of Melanesia (a pre-diocesan jurisdiction, entitled to a titular bishop and exempt, i.e. directly subject to the Holy See) on territory split off from the Apostolic Vicariate of Western Oceania.

On 8 December 1890, it was renamed as Apostolic Vicariate of New Pomerania.

It lost territories repeatedly, to establish :
 on 1896.02.24 the Apostolic Prefecture of Kaiser-Wilhelms-Land
 on 1897.06.28 the Apostolic Vicariate of Gilbert Islands
 on 1897.07.27 the Apostolic Prefecture of British Solomons
 on 1898.05.23 the Apostolic Prefecture of German Solomon Islands (now its suffragan diocese Bougainville)
 in 1905 the Mission sui juris of Marshall Islands.

On 14 November 1922, it was renamed after its see as Apostolic Vicariate of Rabaul.

On 5 July 1957, it lost territory again to establish the Apostolic Vicariate of Kavieng (now its suffragan diocese).

On 15 November 1966, it was promoted as Metropolitan Archdiocese of Rabaul.

On 4 July 2003, it lost territory to establish another suffragan see, the Diocese of Kimbe.

Coat of arms 
The new coat of arms of the Archdiocese was adopted in 2016. The proposal of coat of arms created Marek Sobola, a heraldic specialist from Slovakia, who also made a coat of arms for the Archbishop Francesco Panfilo S.D.B.

Province 
Its ecclesiastical province comprises, besides the Metropolitan's Archdiocese, the following suffragan bishoprics :
 Roman Catholic Diocese of Bougainville
 Roman Catholic Diocese of Kavieng 
 Roman Catholic Diocese of Kimbe.

Bishops 
(all Roman Rite; so far missionary members of Latin congregations)

Ordinaries
 Apostolic Vicars of Melanesia 
 Jean Baptiste Epalle, Marists (S.M.) (1844.07.19 – death 1845.12.19), Titular Bishop of Sion (1844.07.19 – 1845.12.19)
 Jean Georges Collomb, S.M. (1846.02.19 – death 1848.07.16), Titular Bishop of Antiphellus (1846.02.19 – 1848.07.16)
 Father Paolo Reina, Pontifical Institute for Foreign Missions M.E.M. (1852.01.11 – death 1861.03.14)
 Louis-André Navarre, Sacred Heart Missionaries (M.S.C.) (1887.05.17 – 1889.05.10), Titular Bishop of Pentacomia (1887.05.17 – 1888.08.17); later Titular Archbishop of Cyrrhus (1888.08.17 – 1912.01.17), Apostolic Vicar of New Guinea (Papua New Guinea) (1889.05.10 – retired 1908.01)
 
 Apostolic Vicars of New Britain 
 Stanislas Henri Verjus, M.S.C. (1889.05.10 – 1889.12.28), Titular Bishop of Limyra (1889.05.10 – 1892.11.13), later Coadjutor Vicar Apostolic of New Guinea (Papua New Guinea) (1889.12.28 – 1892.11.13)
 Louis Couppé, M.S.C. (1889.12.28 – 1890.12.08 see below), Titular Bishop of Lerus (1889.12.28 – 1925.12.18)

 Apostolic Vicar of new Pomerania 
 Louis Couppé, M.S.C. (see above 1890.12.08 – 1922.11.14 see below)

 Apostolic Vicars of Rabaul 
 Louis Couppé, M.S.C. (see below 1922.11.14 – retired 1923), on emeritate promoted as Titular Archbishop of Hierapolis (1925.12.18 – 1926.07.20)
 Gerard Vesters (Gerardo Vesters), M.S.C. (1923.02.16 – 1938), Titular Bishop of Diocletianopolis in Palæstina (1923.02.16 – death 1954.08.30); previously Prefect Apostolic of Celebes (Indonesia) (1919.12 – 1923.02.16)
 Leo Isidore Scharmach, M.S.C. (1939.06.13 – 1963), Titular Bishop of Mostene (1939.06.13 – 1964.11.26)
 Johannes Höhne, M.S.C. (1963.03.01 – 1966.11.15 see below), Titular Bishop of Urima (1963.03.01 – 1966.11.15)

 Metropolitan Archbishops of Rabaul 
 Johannes Höhne, M.S.C. (1966.11.15 – death 1978.05.27) 
 Albert-Leo Bundervoet, M.S.C. (1980.03.06 – 1989.03.29) 
 Karl Hesse, M.S.C. (1990.07.07 – 2011.08.11), also President of Bishops’ Conference of Papua New Guinea and Soloman Islands (1994 – 1996), Apostolic Administrator sede plena of Bougainville (Papua New Guinea) (1995 – 1996.09.12), again Apostolic Administrator of Bougainville (1996.09.12 – 1999.04.19), President of Bishops’ Conference of Papua New Guinea and Soloman Islands (2002 – 2005); previously Titular Bishop of Naratcata (1978.04.27 – 1980.10.24) & Auxiliary Bishop of Rabaul (1978.04.27 – 1980.10.24), Bishop of Kavieng (Papua New Guinea) (1980.10.24 – 1990.07.07)
 Francesco Panfilo, Salesians (S.D.B.) (2011.08.11 – 2020.06.19), previously Bishop of Alotau–Sideia (Papua New Guinea) (2001.06.25 – 2010.03.18), President of Bishops’ Conference of Papua New Guinea and Soloman Islands (2008.04 – 2011.05), Coadjutor Archbishop of Rabaul (2010.03.18 – 2011.08.11)

Coadjutor archbishop
Francesco Panfilo, S.D.B. (2010-2011)

Auxiliary bishops
Karl Hesse, M.S.C. (1978-1980), appointed Bishop of Kavieng (later returned here as Archbishop)
George To Bata (1978-1995)
Patrick Taval, M.S.C. (1999-2007), appointed Coadjutor Bishop of Kerema
Alphonse Liguori Chaupa (2000-2003), appointed Bishop of Kimbe
John Doaninoel, S.M. (2007-2011), appointed Auxiliary Bishop of Honiara, Solomon Islands

Other priests of this diocese who became bishops
Herman To Paivu, appointed Auxiliary Bishop of Port Moresby in 1974
Benedict To Varpin, appointed Bishop of Bereina in 1979
Francis Meli, appointed Bishop of Vanimo in 2018

See also  
 List of Roman Catholic dioceses in Papua New Guinea

References

Sources and external links 
 GigaCatholic, with incumbent biography links

A